Plocamopherus imperialis is a species of sea slug, a nudibranch, a shell-less marine gastropod mollusk in the family Polyceridae.

Distribution 
This species was described from Port Jackson, S.E. Australia.

References

Angas, G.F., 1864. Description d'espèces nouvelles appartenant à plusieurs genres de Mollusques Nudibranches des environs de Port-Jackson (Nouvelles-Galles du Sud), accompagnée de dessins faits d'après nature. Journal de Conchyliologie, 12: 43-70

External links 
 SeaSlug Forum info

Polyceridae
Gastropods described in 1864